What I'm Feelin' is the sixth studio album by American singer-songwriter Anthony Hamilton. It was released on March 25, 2016, by RCA Records.

Critical reception

Allmusic editor Andy Kellman found that What I'm Feelin "isn't up to the level" of Hamilton's previous albums, "but its strengths are undeniable, too numerous to make the set seem like a disappointment. It starts with the clawing funk of "Save Me" (something of a full-band sequel to "Sista Big Bones"), one of those openers so effective that the temptation to hit "repeat" and skip the rest is very real. Unlike his earlier work, Hamilton here rarely dips into sorrow, instead using more of his time to express desire and gratitude. The range of backdrops is as varied as ever, from solo acoustic piano to burbling synthesizers."

Track listing

Charts

Weekly charts

Year-end charts

References

2016 albums
Anthony Hamilton (musician) albums
Albums produced by Mark Batson
Albums produced by James Poyser
Albums produced by Salaam Remi
RCA Records albums